The Shropshire Union Canal Society is an organisation formed to promote interest in and enhance the Shropshire Union Canal system, in England and Wales.

History
The Shrewsbury & Newport Canal Association was formed in December 1964, with the ambition of restoring to navigation the canals between Norbury Junction and Shrewsbury. A report had appeared in a local newspaper in September, indicating that the British Waterways Board intended to drain part of the Newport Branch of the Shrewsbury Canal, which had been closed since 1944. The Association was formed in response to a suggestion from the North-Western branch of the Inland Waterways Association that a local society was needed to campaign for restoration. In 1966 the Ministry of Transport rejected the restoration proposals, the Association changed its name to the Shropshire Union Canal Society and two years later, in 1968, set out to restore the Montgomery Canal.

See also

Canals of the United Kingdom
History of the British canal system
Shrewsbury & Newport Canals Trust

Bibliography

References

External links
Shropshire Union Canal Society

Waterways organisations in England
Organisations based in Shropshire
Shropshire Union Canal
Organizations established in 1964